The Our Lady of Refuge Cathedral (also Matamoros Cathedral) is the main Catholic church in the city of Matamoros, Tamaulipas, Mexico. It is the headquarters of the Diocese of Matamoros. It was built in the 19th century, and is located in the historical center of the city.

The work was initiated by Father Nicolás Ballí in the early nineteenth century. The church, with Neoclassical architecture, has three naves. Over the years the cathedral has undergone slight modifications.

The façade, also in Neoclassical style, has three access arches flanked by Tuscan columns, six in total.

See also
Roman Catholicism in Mexico

References

Roman Catholic cathedrals in Mexico
Roman Catholic churches completed in 1831
19th-century Roman Catholic church buildings in Mexico